The Sikkim Legislative Assembly is the unicameral legislature of the Indian state of Sikkim.

The seat of the Legislative Assembly is at Gangtok, the capital of the state. The term of the Legislative Assembly is five years, unless dissolved earlier. Presently, it comprises 32 members who are directly elected from single-seat constituencies.

Reservations
The constituencies of Sikkim's legislative assembly have the following reservation status:
 1 constituency (Sangha) is reserved for registered Buddhist monks and nuns from the state's monasteries.
 2 constituencies (West Pendam and Salghari-Zoom) are reserved for people of the Scheduled Castes (SC).
 12 constituencies are reserved for people of the Bhutia-Lepcha (BL) community.
 The rest of the constituencies aren't reserved.

Constituencies
Following are the list of constituencies in the Legislative Assembly of Sikkim:

References 

 
Sikkim
Constituencies